Ayling Martínez (born 4 September 1983) is a Cuban handball player. She is member of the Cuban national team. She competed at the 2015 World Women's Handball Championship in Denmark.

References

1983 births
Living people
Cuban female handball players
Expatriate handball players
Cuban expatriate sportspeople in Spain
Place of birth missing (living people)
Handball players at the 2007 Pan American Games
Handball players at the 2015 Pan American Games
Pan American Games medalists in handball
Pan American Games silver medalists for Cuba
Medalists at the 2007 Pan American Games
21st-century Cuban women